Tadanaga (written: 忠長 or 忠良) is a masculine Japanese given name. Notable people with the name include:

 (1806–1864), Japanese daimyō
 (1606–1633), Japanese daimyō

Japanese masculine given names